Karis is  town and former municipality in  Uusimaa, Finland.

Karis may also refer to:
Mourvèdre, red wine grape variety
Torrontés, white grape variety
Karis, surname
Alar Karis, President of Estonia

See also
Karas (disambiguation)
Caris (disambiguation)